Tognazzini is an Italian surname. Notable people with the surname include:

Anthony Tognazzini (born 1969), American writer
Bruce Tognazzini (born 1945), American consultant and designer

See also

Tognazzi

Italian-language surnames